Daryl Worley (born February 22, 1995) is an American football cornerback for the Baltimore Ravens of the National Football League (NFL). He played college football at West Virginia, and was drafted by the Carolina Panthers in the third round of the 2016 NFL Draft.

Early years
Worley attended the William Penn Charter School and was a standout receiver and safety for head coach Jeff Humble. As a receiver, he earned first-team honors during his junior and senior seasons. 

As a defensive back, he earned first-team honors as a senior. He was an All-Southeastern Pennsylvania First-team defensive back and 2-time Penn Inter-Ac League First-team football player. He was rated as Southeastern Pennsylvania's top cornerback by the Philadelphia Inquirer coming out of high school.

College career
Worley attended West Virginia University where he played for the Mountaineers from 2013 to 2015. As a true freshman, he played in 11 games and started 5 games. He was primarily used on special teams and finished the season with 45 tackles (36 solo and 3 TFLs) and 1 interception. He was also second on the team with five pass breakups. 

As a sophomore, he started in all 11 games for the Mountaineers. He led the team with 3 interceptions. He was also the fifth-leading tackler on the team with 52 tackles (44 solo and 4.5 TFLs) and also recorded 4 pass breakups. He was named the Iron Mountaineer honoree for excellence in the weight room. His three interceptions tied him for 11th in the Big 12 Conference. 

As a junior, Worley earned 1st Team All-Big 12 honors after finishing among the nation's leaders with 6 interceptions and 12 pass breakups. He also recorded 49 tackles (46 solo and 2 TFLs) and forced 2 fumbles on the year. Despite a recommendation from the NFL Draft Advisory Committee to return to school, Worley decided to forgo his final season of eligibility and enter the 2016 NFL Draft.

Professional career

Carolina Panthers
Worley was selected by the Carolina Panthers in the third round (77th overall) of the 2016 NFL Draft. On May 10, 2016, the Carolina Panthers signed Worley to a four-year, $3.23 million contract that included a signing bonus of $783,684.

He opened the 2016 NFL season as third on the cornerback depth chart, behind veteran Bené Benwikere and fellow rookie James Bradberry. After Julio Jones had 300 receiving yards over the Carolina Panthers in Week 4 of the NFL season, primarily against Benwikere and Worley, Benwikere was released.  This made Bradberry the number one starting cornerback, Worley the number two, and fellow rookie Zack Sanchez the number three. Worley steadily improved throughout the year and finished the season ranked as the twelfth best cornerback against the run by respected analytical site Pro Football Focus.

In 2017, he appeared in 15 games with 14 starts at right cornerback. He was declared inactive in the fourth game against the New England Patriots. He collected 64 tackles (4 for loss), 2 interceptions, 10 passes defensed, one sack and one quarterback hit.

Philadelphia Eagles
On March 9, 2018, the Carolina Panthers agreed to trade Worley to the Philadelphia Eagles in exchange for wide receiver Torrey Smith. The deal became official on March 14, 2018.

On April 15, 2018, the Philadelphia Police Department arrested Worley for driving under the influence, disorderly conduct, and violation of the uniform firearms act. Worley was found by police passed out in his vehicle while blocking a highway that was near a team facility. It was reported the arrest was at 6AM and police were required to use a taser on Worley after he became combative. On April 16, 2018, the Philadelphia Eagles officially released Worley due to his arrest.

Oakland Raiders
On April 23, 2018, the Oakland Raiders signed Worley to a one-year, $630,000 contract at the league minimum. He was suspended the first four games of 2018 for violating the NFL Policy and Program for Substances of Abuse and the Personal Conduct Policy. In Week 6 against the Seattle Seahawks, Worley made 5 tackles and intercepted quarterback Russell Wilson. He was placed on injured reserve on December 24, 2018. He finished the season playing in 10 games with nine starts, recording 33 tackles, seven passes defensed and one interception. 

On March 7, 2019, the Raiders placed a second-round restricted free agent tender on Worley.
In week 9 against the Detroit Lions, Worley recorded a one-handed interception off Matthew Stafford, that was intended for wide receiver Kenny Golladay in the endzone during the 31–24 win. In Week 15, he missed the game against the Jacksonville Jaguars with a neck injury. He started 15 games at left cornerback, totaling 58 tackles, one interception, 8 passes defensed and one fumble recovery. He also played defensive snaps at safety and slot cornerback.

Dallas Cowboys
On April 29, 2020, the Dallas Cowboys signed Worley to a one-year, $3 million contract that includes a signing bonus of $1 million. Throughout training camp, Worley competed to be the starting right cornerback against Anthony Brown and rookie Trevon Diggs. He was also used at the safety position. In the third game against the Seattle Seahawks, the Cowboys were forced to start him at left cornerback opposite Diggs, after Chidobe Awuzie was placed on the injured reserve with a hamstring injury, joining Brown who was already on injured reserve with a rib injury. He struggled in his 4 straight starts and was often targeted in coverage by the opposing teams. In the sixth game against the Arizona Cardinals, he was benched after giving up an 80-yard touchdown reception to wide receiver Christian Kirk, while being in zone coverage. His defensive snaps were limited the rest of the way, until being released on October 28,  2020, as part of a roster purge that included free agency acquisitions Dontari Poe and Everson Griffen. He posted 13 tackles and one pass defensed in 7 appearances with 4 starts.

Buffalo Bills
On November 3, 2020, Worley was signed to the Buffalo Bills practice squad. He was elevated to the active roster on November 14, 2020, for the team's week 10 game against the Arizona Cardinals, and reverted to the practice squad after the game.

Las Vegas Raiders
On December 9, 2020, Worley was signed by the Las Vegas Raiders off the Bills' practice squad, to provide depth with injuries suffered by Damon Arnette, Lamarcus Joyner and Johnathan Abram. He was placed on the reserve/COVID-19 list by the team on December 18, 2020. and activated on December 30, 2020. He appeared in 2 games with one start, making 8 tackles and 2 passes defensed. He wasn't re-signed after the season.

Arizona Cardinals
On July 26, 2021, Worley signed with the Arizona Cardinals. He was released on August 31, 2021.

Detroit Lions
On September 15, 2021, Worley was signed to the Detroit Lions practice squad. He was promoted to the active roster on September 22, 2021. He was released on October 26, 2021, and re-signed to the practice squad. He was released on November 4,  2021.

Baltimore Ravens

On December 21, 2021, Worley was signed to the Baltimore Ravens practice squad. He was brought back by the Baltimore Ravens on August 8, 2022. He was released on August 30, 2022 and signed to the practice squad the next day. He was promoted to the active roster on September 17. He was waived on September 27 and re-signed to the practice squad. He was promoted back to the active roster on October 8, then released again three days later and re-signed to the practice squad. He was promoted back to the active roster on October 22. He was placed on injured reserve on December 10 before being activated again on January 7.

On February 15, 2023, Worley re-signed with the Ravens.

NFL career statistics

References

External links
West Virginia Mountaineers bio

1995 births
Living people
Players of American football from Philadelphia
American football cornerbacks
West Virginia Mountaineers football players
Carolina Panthers players
Philadelphia Eagles players
Oakland Raiders players
Dallas Cowboys players
Buffalo Bills players
Las Vegas Raiders players
Arizona Cardinals players
Detroit Lions players
Baltimore Ravens players